Gordita Chronicles is an American comedy series that premiered on the streaming service HBO Max on June 23, 2022. The series tells the story of Cucu Castelli, a reporter who narrates her youth in the 1980s as a willful and reluctant "gordita" (transl. "chubby girl") whose family immigrates to Miami, Florida from the Dominican Republic. Cucu's father is a rising executive with an airline serving Florida and the Caribbean.

On July 29, 2022, it was announced the series was cancelled after one season. Sony Pictures Television plans to shop the series elsewhere. In December 2022, the series was removed from HBO Max.

Cast 

 Olivia Goncalves as Carlota 'Cucu' Castelli
 Juan Javier Cardenas as Victor Castelli, Cucu's father
 Diana-Maria Riva as Adela Castelli (née Torres), Cucu's mother
 Savannah Nicole Ruiz as Emilia Castelli, Cucu's sister
 Cosette Hauer as Ashley
 Noah Rico as Yosmel "Yoshy" Hernandez
 Dascha Polanco as the voice of Adult Cucu
Patrick Fabian as Mr. Frank, Victor's Boss
Tati McQuay as Dani
Pete Gardner as Keith Colorado

Episodes

References 

HBO Max original programming
2020s American comedy television series
2022 American television series debuts
2022 American television series endings
English-language television shows
Television series about children
Television series about families
Television series set in the 1980s
Television shows set in Miami
Television series by Sony Pictures Television